{{DISPLAYTITLE:C13H20O}}
The molecular formula C13H20O (molar mass: 192.30 g/mol, exact mass: 192.1514 u) may refer to:

 Damascone
 Ionone

Molecular formulas